This is a list of all first-class cricket matches played between the Gentlemen and Players between 1806 and 1962. Unless otherwise stated, all matches were scheduled for three days' duration and eleven-a-side.

Note that there is considerable disagreement about when first-class cricket as such began, with various dates having been put forward between 1772 and 1895, while some definitions of first-class cricket require that such a match be arranged between teams of eleven-a-side. Thus, some of the early matches in this list are not considered first-class by some authorities.

Three matches were cancelled:
The first, scheduled to start on 7 September 1914 at Scarborough, was cancelled due to the outbreak of World War I.
The second, scheduled to start on 9 July 1930 at The Oval, was cancelled due to fixture issues surrounding the County Championship and a second match scheduled (and subsequently played) at Lord's a week later.
The third, scheduled to start on 6 September 1939 at Scarborough, was cancelled due to the outbreak of World War II.

Summary of results

Matches
{| class="wikitable" style="width:100%
! colspan=14 | List of Gentlemen v Players matches
|-
!No.
!Date
!Venue
!Winners
!Winning margin
!Notes
!Ref(s)
|-
|1
|7 July 1806
|Lord's Old Ground
|style="background:#B3B7FF"|Gentlemen
|innings and 14 runs
|
|
|-
|2
|21 July 1806
|Lord's Old Ground
|style="background:#B3B7FF"|Gentlemen
|82 runs
|
|
|-
|3
|7 July 1819
|Lord's Cricket Ground
|style="background:#FFCBCB"|Players
|six wickets
|
|
|-
|4
|19 June 1820
|Lord's
|style="background:#B3B7FF"|Gentlemen
|70 runs
|
|
|-
|5
|23 July 1821
|Lord's
|style="background:#FFCBCB"|Players
|Gentlemen conceded defeat
|Played to celebrate the coronation of George IV.
|
|-
|6
|8 July 1822
|Lord's
|style="background:#B3B7FF"|Gentlemen
|six wickets
|
|
|-
|7
|21 July 1823
|Lord's
|style="background:#FFCBCB"|Players
|345 runs
| Gentlemen, set 402 to win, were bowled out for 56 with two men absent hurt and another retired hurt. 
|
|-
|8
|2 August 1824
|Lord's
|style="background:#FFCBCB"|Players
|101 runs
|Gentlemen had 14 men.
|
|-
|9
|4 July 1825
|Lord's
|style="background:#B3B7FF"|Gentlemen
|72 runs
|Four-day match; Gentlemen had 16 men.
|
|-
|10
|25 June 1827
|Lord's
|style="background:#B3B7FF"|Gentlemen
|29 runs
|Gentlemen had 17 men.
|
|-
|11
|9 July 1827
|Lord's
|style="background:#FFCBCB"|Players
|innings and 42 runs
|Gentlemen had 17 men.
|
|-
|12
|22 June 1829
|Lord's
|style="background:#B3B7FF"|Gentlemen
|193 runs
|Gentlemen had 12 men;  Players were bowled out for 24 and 37.
|
|-
|13
|14 June 1830
|Lord's
|style="background:#FFEBAD"|Drawn
|
|Gentlemen had 12 men; rain ended play on the first day, and washed out the second and third days after the Gentlemen had been bowled out for 46, with the Players 17/3 in reply.
|
|-
|14
|25 June 1831
|Lord's
|style="background:#FFCBCB"|Players
|five wickets
|The match was arranged as eleven-a-side, but Players only had nine men appear; the match was still considered first-class.
|
|-
|15
|27 August 1832
|Lord's
|style="background:#FFCBCB"|Players
|innings and 34 runs
|Gentlemen defended a smaller-than-normal wicket of 22 by 6 inches.
|
|-
|16
|8 July 1833
|Lord's
|style="background:#FFCBCB"|Players
|nine wickets
|Gentlemen had 16 men.
|
|-
|17
|28 July 1834
|Lord's
|style="background:#FFCBCB"|Players
|innings and 21 runs
|
|
|-
|18
|20 July 1835
|Lord's
|style="background:#FFCBCB"|Players
|six wickets
|
|
|-
|19
|25 July 1836
|Lord's
|style="background:#B3B7FF"|Gentlemen
|35 runs
|Gentlemen had 18 men.
|
|-
|20
|3 July 1837
|Lord's
|style="background:#FFCBCB"|Players
|innings and 10 runs
|Players defended an oversized wicket of four stumps measuring 36 by 12 inches, and won despite being bowled out for 99, having been 17/8.
|
|-
|21
|17 July 1837
|Lord's
|style="background:#FFCBCB"|Players
|innings and 38 runs
|Gentlemen had 16 men.
|
|-
|22
|30 July 1838
|Lord's
|style="background:#FFCBCB"|Players
|40 runs
|
|
|-
|23
|29 July 1839
|Lord's
|style="background:#FFEBAD"|Drawn
|
|
|
|-
|24
|29 June 1840
|Lord's
|style="background:#FFCBCB"|Players
|nine wickets
|
|
|-
|25
|12 July 1841
|Lord's
|style="background:#FFCBCB"|Players
|three wickets
|
|
|-
|26
|25 July 1842
|Lord's
|style="background:#B3B7FF"|Gentlemen
|95 runs
|
|
|-
|27
|31 July 1843
|Lord's
|style="background:#B3B7FF"|Gentlemen
|innings and 20 runs
|
|
|-
|28
|29 July 1844
|Lord's
|style="background:#FFCBCB"|Players
|38 runs
|
|
|-
|29
|21 July 1845
|Lord's
|style="background:#FFCBCB"|Players
|67 runs
|Four-day match.
|
|-
|30
|15 September 1845
|Brighton
|style="background:#FFEBAD"|Drawn
|
| Rain ended play on the first day, and washed out the second and third days, after the Players reached 119/3. 
|
|-
|31
|20 July 1846
|Lord's
|style="background:#B3B7FF"|Gentlemen
|one wicket
|
|
|-
|32
|19 July 1847
|Lord's
|style="background:#FFCBCB"|Players
|147 runs
|
|
|-
|33
|31 July 1848
|Lord's
|style="background:#B3B7FF"|Gentlemen
|27 runs
| Gentlemen won despite being bowled out for 31 in their first innings; Players, set 105 to win, were bowled out for 77. 
|
|-
|34
|23 July 1849
|Lord's
|style="background:#B3B7FF"|Gentlemen
|innings and 40 runs
|
|
|-
|35
|22 July 1850
|Lord's
|style="background:#FFCBCB"|Players
|innings and 48 runs
|
|
|-
|36
|23 June 1851
|Lord's
|style="background:#FFCBCB"|Players
|innings and 14 runs
|
|
|-
|37
|21 July 1851
|Lord's
|style="background:#FFCBCB"|Players
|innings and 22 runs
|
|
|-
|38
|19 July 1852
|Lord's
|style="background:#FFCBCB"|Players
|five wickets
|
|
|-
|39
|18 July 1853
|Lord's
|style="background:#B3B7FF"|Gentlemen
|60 runs
|Gentlemen won despite being bowled out for 37 in their second innings.
|
|-
|40
|17 July 1854
|Lord's
|style="background:#FFCBCB"|Players
|nine wickets
|
|
|-
|41
|23 July 1855
|Lord's
|style="background:#FFCBCB"|Players
|seven wickets
| Gentlemen, after leading on first innings, were bowled out for 43. 
|
|-
|42
|21 July 1856
|Lord's
|style="background:#FFCBCB"|Players
|two wickets
|
|
|-
|43
|2 July 1857
|The Oval
|style="background:#FFCBCB"|Players
|ten wickets
|
|
|-
|44
|13 July 1857
|Lord's
|style="background:#FFCBCB"|Players
|13 runs
|
|
|-
|45
|1 July 1858
|The Oval
|style="background:#FFCBCB"|Players
|three wickets
|
|
|-
|46
|19 July 1858
|Lord's
|style="background:#FFCBCB"|Players
|285 runs
|
|
|-
|47
|30 June 1859
|The Oval
|style="background:#FFCBCB"|Players
|innings and 25 runs
|
|
|-
|48
|18 July 1859
|Lord's
|style="background:#FFCBCB"|Players
|169 runs
|
|
|-
|49
|5 July 1860
|The Oval
|style="background:#FFCBCB"|Players
|eight wickets
|
|
|-
|50
|9 July 1860
|Lord's
|style="background:#FFCBCB"|Players
|innings and 181 runs
|
|
|-
|51
|1 July 1861
|Lord's
|style="background:#FFCBCB"|Players
|innings and 60 runs
|
|
|-
|52
|4 July 1861
|The Oval
|style="background:#FFCBCB"|Players
|innings and 68 runs
|
|
|-
|53
|26 June 1862
|The Oval
|style="background:#FFEBAD"|Drawn
|
|
|
|-
|54
|14 July 1862
|Lord's
|style="background:#FFCBCB"|Players
|157 runs
|
|
|-
|55
|29 July 1863
|Lord's
|style="background:#FFCBCB"|Players
|eight wickets
|
|
|-
|56
|2 July 1863
|The Oval
|style="background:#FFCBCB"|Players
|nine wickets
|
|
|-
|57
|23 June 1864
|The Oval
|style="background:#FFCBCB"|Players
|205 runs
|
|
|-
|58
|27 June 1864
|Lord's
|style="background:#FFCBCB"|Players
|innings and 68 runs
| Gentlemen were bowled out for 60, and following-on, 59. 
|
|-
|59
|3 July 1865
|The Oval
|style="background:#FFCBCB"|Players
|118 runs
|
|
|-
|60
|10 July 1865
|Lord's
|style="background:#B3B7FF"|Gentlemen
|eight wickets
| Gentlemen broke a winless streak of 20 matches (19 losses, 1 drawn). 
|
|-
|61
|25 June 1866
|Lord's
|style="background:#FFCBCB"|Players
|38 runs
|
|
|-
|62
|28 June 1866
|The Oval
|style="background:#B3B7FF"|Gentlemen
|98 runs
| Gentlemen won after being required to follow-on.  
|
|-
|63
|8 July 1867
|Lord's
|style="background:#B3B7FF"|Gentlemen
|eight wickets
|
|
|-
|64
|15 July 1867
|The Oval
|style="background:#FFEBAD"|Drawn
|
|
|
|-
|65
|29 June 1868
|Lord's
|style="background:#B3B7FF"|Gentlemen
|eight wickets
|
|
|-
|66
|2 July 1868
|The Oval
|style="background:#B3B7FF"|Gentlemen
|innings and 87 runs
|
|
|-
|67
|24 June 1869
|The Oval
|style="background:#B3B7FF"|Gentlemen
|17 runs
|
|
|-
|68
|28 June 1869
|Lord's
|style="background:#B3B7FF"|Gentlemen
|three wickets
|
|
|-
|69
|14 July 1870
|The Oval
|style="background:#FFEBAD"|Drawn
|
|
|
|-
|70
|18 July 1870
|Lord's
|style="background:#B3B7FF"|Gentlemen
|four runs
|
|
|-
|71
|3 July 1871
|Lord's
|style="background:#FFEBAD"|Drawn
|
|
|
|-
|72
|6 July 1871
|The Oval
|style="background:#B3B7FF"|Gentlemen
|five wickets
|
|
|-
|73
|14 August 1871
|Royal Brunswick Ground, Hove
|style="background:#FFEBAD"|Drawn
|
|
|
|-
|74
|1 July 1872
|Lord's
|style="background:#B3B7FF"|Gentlemen
|seven wickets
|
|
|-
|75
|4 July 1872
|The Oval
|style="background:#B3B7FF"|Gentlemen
|nine wickets
|
|
|-
|76
|30 June 1873
|Lord's
|style="background:#B3B7FF"|Gentlemen
|innings and 55 runs
|
|
|-
|77
|3 July 1873
|The Oval
|style="background:#B3B7FF"|Gentlemen
|innings and 11 runs
|
|
|-
|78
|17 July 1873
|Prince's Cricket Ground, London
|style="background:#B3B7FF"|Gentlemen
|innings and 54 runs
|
|
|-
|79
|2 July 1874
|The Oval
|style="background:#B3B7FF"|Gentlemen
|48 runs
|
|
|-
|80
|6 July 1874
|Lord's
|style="background:#FFCBCB"|Players
|two wickets
| Players broke a winless streak of 18 matches (15 losses, 3 drawn). 
|
|-
|81
|23 July 1874
|Prince's Cricket Ground
|style="background:#B3B7FF"|Gentlemen
|60 runs
|
|
|-
|82
|1 July 1875
|The Oval
|style="background:#FFEBAD"|Drawn
|
|
|
|-
|83
|5 July 1875
|Lord's
|style="background:#B3B7FF"|Gentlemen
|262 runs
|
|
|-
|84
|22 July 1875
|Prince's Cricket Ground
|style="background:#FFCBCB"|Players
|43 runs
|
|
|-
|85
|29 June 1876
|The Oval
|style="background:#FFEBAD"|Drawn
|
|
|
|-
|86
|3 July 1876
|Lord's
|style="background:#B3B7FF"|Gentlemen
|innings and 98 runs
|
|
|-
|87
|6 July 1876
|Prince's Cricket Ground
|style="background:#B3B7FF"|Gentlemen
|five wickets
|
|
|-
|88
|28 June 1877
|The Oval
|style="background:#FFEBAD"|Drawn
|
|
|
|-
|89
|2 July 1877
|Lord's
|style="background:#B3B7FF"|Gentlemen
|one wicket
|Gentlemen added 46 for the last wicket to win, setting a new first-class record.
|
|-
|90
|5 July 1877
|Prince's Cricket Ground
|style="background:#B3B7FF"|Gentlemen
|nine wickets
|
|
|-
|91
|4 July 1878
|The Oval
|style="background:#B3B7FF"|Gentlemen
|55 runs
|
|
|-
|92
|8 July 1878
|Lord's
|style="background:#B3B7FF"|Gentlemen
|206 runs
|
|
|-
|93
|3 July 1879
|The Oval
|style="background:#B3B7FF"|Gentlemen
|innings and 126 runs
|
|
|-
|94
|7 July 1879
|Lord's
|style="background:#FFEBAD"|Drawn
|
|
|
|-
|95
|1 July 1880
|The Oval
|style="background:#FFCBCB"|Players
|37 runs
|
|
|-
|96
|5 July 1880
|Lord's
|style="background:#B3B7FF"|Gentlemen
|five wickets
|
|
|-
|97
|30 June 1881
|The Oval
|style="background:#B3B7FF"|Gentlemen
|two wickets
|
|
|-
|98
|11 July 1881
|Lord's
|style="background:#B3B7FF"|Gentlemen
|five wickets
|
|
|-
|99
|8 August 1881
|County Ground, Hove
|style="background:#FFCBCB"|Players
|one run
|Gentlemen, set 113 to win, went from 56/0 to 111 all out.
|
|-
|100
|29 June 1882
|The Oval
|style="background:#FFCBCB"|Players
|87 runs
|
|
|-
|101
|3 July 1882
|Lord's
|style="background:#B3B7FF"|Gentlemen
|eight wickets
|
|
|-
|102
|28 June 1883
|The Oval
|style="background:#ACE1AF"|Tied
|
| Gentlemen, set 150 to win, were bowled out for 149. 
|
|-
|103
|9 July 1883
|Lord's
|style="background:#B3B7FF"|Gentlemen
|seven wickets
|
|
|-
|104
|3 July 1884
|The Oval
|style="background:#FFCBCB"|Players
|nine wickets
|
|
|-
|105
|7 July 1884
|Lord's
|style="background:#B3B7FF"|Gentlemen
|six wickets
|
|
|-
|106
|2 July 1885
|The Oval
|style="background:#FFEBAD"|Drawn
|
|
|
|-
|107
|6 July 1885
|Lord's
|style="background:#FFCBCB"|Players
|four wickets
|
|
|-
|108
|3 September 1885
|Scarborough
|style="background:#B3B7FF"|Gentlemen
|innings and 25 runs
|
|
|-
|109
|12 July 1886
|Lord's
|style="background:#FFCBCB"|Players
|five wickets
|
|
|-
|110
|15 July 1886
|The Oval
|style="background:#FFEBAD"|Drawn
|
|
|
|-
|111
|11 July 1887
|Lord's
|style="background:#FFCBCB"|Players
|innings and 123 runs
|
|
|-
|112
|14 July 1887
|The Oval
|style="background:#FFCBCB"|Players
|innings and 16 runs
|
|
|-
|113
|9 July 1888
|Lord's
|style="background:#B3B7FF"|Gentlemen
|five runs
| Players, set 78 to win, were bowled out for 72. 
|
|-
|114
|12 July 1888
|The Oval
|style="background:#FFCBCB"|Players
|innings and 39 runs
|
|
|-
|115
|4 July 1889
|The Oval
|style="background:#FFCBCB"|Players
|nine wickets
|
|
|-
|116
|8 July 1889
|Lord's
|style="background:#FFCBCB"|Players
|ten wickets
|
|
|-
|117
|6 September 1889
|Hastings
|style="background:#B3B7FF"|Gentlemen
|one wicket
|
|
|-
|118
|3 July 1890
|The Oval
|style="background:#FFCBCB"|Players
|nine wickets
|
|
|-
|119
|7 July 1890
|Lord's
|style="background:#FFEBAD"|Drawn
|
|
|
|-
|120
|2 July 1891
|The Oval
|style="background:#B3B7FF"|Gentlemen
|innings and 54 runs
|
|
|-
|121
|6 July 1891
|Lord's
|style="background:#FFEBAD"|Drawn
|
|
|
|-
|122
|14 September 1891
|Hastings
|style="background:#FFCBCB"|Players
|innings and 128 runs
|
|
|-
|123
|4 July 1892
|Lord's
|style="background:#FFCBCB"|Players
|innings and 26 runs
|
|
|-
|124
|11 July 1892
|The Oval
|style="background:#FFCBCB"|Players
|ten wickets
|
|
|-
|125
|1 September 1892
|Scarborough
|style="background:#FFEBAD"|Drawn
|
|
|
|-
|126
|12 September 1892
|Hastings
|style="background:#FFEBAD"|Drawn
|
|
|
|-
|127
|6 July 1893
|The Oval
|style="background:#FFCBCB"|Players
|eight runs
|
|
|-
|128
|10 July 1893
|Lord's
|style="background:#FFEBAD"|Drawn
|
|
|
|-
|129
|5 July 1894
|The Oval
|style="background:#FFCBCB"|Players
|innings and 27 runs
|
|
|-
|130
|9 July 1894
|The Oval
|style="background:#B3B7FF"|Gentlemen
|innings and 39 runs
|
|
|-
|131
|10 September 1894
|Hastings
|style="background:#FFEBAD"|Drawn
|
|
|
|-
|132
|8 July 1895
|Lord's
|style="background:#FFCBCB"|Players
|32 runs
|
|
|-
|133
|11 July 1895
|The Oval
|style="background:#FFEBAD"|Drawn
|
|
|
|-
|134
|6 July 1896
|The Oval
|style="background:#B3B7FF"|Gentlemen
|one wicket
|
|
|-
|135
|13 July 1896
|Lord's
|style="background:#B3B7FF"|Gentlemen
|six wickets
|
|
|-
|136
|8 July 1897
|The Oval
|style="background:#FFCBCB"|Players
|eight wickets
|
|
|-
|137
|12 July 1897
|Lord's
|style="background:#FFCBCB"|Players
|78 runs
|
|
|-
|138
|30 August 1897
|Scarborough
|style="background:#FFEBAD"|Drawn
|
|
|
|-
|139
|13 September 1897
|Hastings
|style="background:#FFCBCB"|Players
|175 runs
|
|
|-
|140
|13 June 1898
|The Oval
|style="background:#FFCBCB"|Players
|eight wickets
|
|
|-
|141
|18 July 1898
|Lord's
|style="background:#FFCBCB"|Players
|137 runs
|
|
|-
|142
|29 August 1898
|Scarborough
|style="background:#B3B7FF"|Gentlemen
|eight wickets
|
|
|-
|143
|6 July 1899
|The Oval
|style="background:#FFCBCB"|Players
|innings and 36 runs
|
|
|-
|144
|10 July 1899
|Lord's
|style="background:#B3B7FF"|Gentlemen
|innings and 59 runs
|Digby Jephson (Gentlemen) took 6–21 with underarm lobs.
|
|-
|145
|9 July 1900
|The Oval
|style="background:#FFCBCB"|Players
|37 runs
|The umpires were replaced at lunch on the first day after an objection from Gentlemen captain W. G. Grace.
|
|-
|146
|16 July 1900
|Lord's
|style="background:#FFCBCB"|Players
|two wickets
|Despite Tip Foster (102 & 136) being the first man to score a century in each innings in these matches, Players scored 502/8 in their second innings to win.
|
|-
|147
|30 August 1900
|Scarborough
|style="background:#FFCBCB"|Players
|innings and 22 runs
|
|
|-
|148
|8 July 1901
|Lord's
|style="background:#FFCBCB"|Players
|221 runs
|
|
|-
|149
|11 July 1901
|The Oval
|style="background:#FFCBCB"|Players
|ten wickets
|
|
|-
|150
|9 September 1901
|Hastings
|style="background:#FFEBAD"|Drawn
|
|
|
|-
|151
|7 July 1902
|Lord's
|style="background:#FFCBCB"|Players
|innings and 68 runs
|
|
|-
|152
|10 July 1902
|The Oval
|style="background:#FFEBAD"|Drawn
|
|
|
|-
|153
|1 September 1902
|Scarborough
|style="background:#FFEBAD"|Drawn
|
|
|
|-
|154
|6 July 1903
|Lord's
|style="background:#FFEBAD"|Drawn
|
|Gentlemen made 500/2 declared following on (C. B. Fry 232*).
|
|-
|155
|9 July 1903
|Scarborough
|style="background:#B3B7FF"|Gentlemen
|54 runs
|
|
|-
|156
|31 August 1903
|Scarborough
|style="background:#FFCBCB"|Players
|innings and eight runs
|
|
|-
|157
|10 September 1903
|Hastings
|style="background:#FFEBAD"|Drawn
|
|
|
|-
|158
|4 July 1904
|Lord's
|style="background:#B3B7FF"|Gentlemen
|two wickets
|
|
|-
|159
|7 July 1904
|The Oval
|style="background:#B3B7FF"|Gentlemen
|innings and 39 runs
|
|
|-
|160
|10 July 1905
|Lord's
|style="background:#FFCBCB"|Players
|105 runs
|
|
|-
|161
|17 July 1905
|The Oval
|style="background:#FFCBCB"|Players
|128 runs
|
|
|-
|162
|9 July 1906
|Lord's
|style="background:#B3B7FF"|Gentlemen
|45 runs
|
|
|-
|163
|16 July 1906
|The Oval
|style="background:#FFEBAD"|Drawn
|
|
|
|-
|164
|6 September 1906
|Scarborough
|style="background:#FFEBAD"|Drawn
|
|
|
|-
|165
|8 July 1907
|Lord's
|style="background:#FFEBAD"|Drawn
|
|
|
|-
|166
|15 July 1907
|The Oval
|style="background:#FFCBCB"|Players
|54 runs
|
|
|-
|167
|2 July 1908
|Lord's
|style="background:#FFCBCB"|Players
|seven wickets
|
|
|-
|168
|9 July 1908
|The Oval
|style="background:#B3B7FF"|Gentlemen
|six wickets
|
|
|-
|169
|3 September 1908
|Scarborough
|style="background:#FFEBAD"|Drawn
|
|
|
|-
|170
|8 July 1909
|The Oval
|style="background:#FFCBCB"|Players
|64 runs
|
|
|-
|171
|12 July 1909
|Lord's
|style="background:#FFCBCB"|Players
|200 runs
|
|
|-
|172
|6 September 1909
|Scarborough
|style="background:#FFEBAD"|Drawn
|
|
|
|-
|173
|7 July 1910
|The Oval
|style="background:#FFCBCB"|Players
|innings and 22 runs
|
|
|-
|174
|11 July 1910
|Lord's
|style="background:#FFCBCB"|Players
|ten wickets
|
|
|-
|175
|5 September 1910
|Scarborough
|style="background:#FFEBAD"|Drawn
|
|
|
|-
|176
|6 July 1911
|The Oval
|style="background:#FFEBAD"|Drawn
|
|
|
|-
|177
|10 July 1911
|Lord's
|style="background:#B3B7FF"|Gentlemen
|130 runs
|
|
|-
|178
|4 September 1911
|Scarborough
|style="background:#FFEBAD"|Drawn
|
|
|
|-
|179
|11 July 1912
|The Oval
|style="background:#FFEBAD"|Drawn
|
|
|
|-
|180
|18 July 1912
|Lord's
|style="background:#FFEBAD"|Drawn
|
|
|
|-
|181
|10 July 1913
|The Oval
|style="background:#FFEBAD"|Drawn
|
|
|
|-
|182
|14 July 1913
|Lord's
|style="background:#FFCBCB"|Players
|seven wickets
|
|
|-
|183
|4 September 1913
|Scarborough
|style="background:#B3B7FF"|Gentlemen
|six runs
|
|
|-
|184
|9 July 1914
|The Oval
|style="background:#FFCBCB"|Players
|241 runs
|
|
|-
|185
|13 July 1914
|Lord's
|style="background:#B3B7FF"|Gentlemen
|134 runs
|
|
|-
|186
|3 July 1919
|The Oval
|style="background:#FFEBAD"|Drawn
|
|
|
|-
|187
|14 July 1919
|Lord's
|style="background:#FFEBAD"|Drawn
|
|
|
|-
|188
|4 September 1919
|Lord's
|style="background:#FFCBCB"|Players
|innings and 110 runs
|Jack Hobbs uniquely scored centuries in all three matches in 1919.
|
|-
|189
|3 June 1920
|The Oval
|style="background:#FFCBCB"|Players
|innings and 87 runs
|
|
|-
|190
|14 July 1920
|Lord's
|style="background:#FFCBCB"|Players
|seven wickets
|
|
|-
|191
|6 September 1920
|Scarborough
|style="background:#FFEBAD"|Drawn
|
|
|
|-
|192
|29 June 1921
|Lord's
|style="background:#FFCBCB"|Players
|innings and three runs
|
|
|-
|193
|13 July 1921
|Lord's
|style="background:#FFCBCB"|Players
|nine wickets
|
|
|-
|194
|5 September 1921
|Scarborough
|style="background:#FFCBCB"|Players
|198 runs
|
|
|-
|195
|5 July 1922
|The Oval
|style="background:#FFEBAD"|Drawn
|
|
|
|-
|196
|19 July 1922
|Lord's
|style="background:#FFEBAD"|Drawn
|
|
|
|-
|197
|7 September 1922
|Scarborough
|style="background:#FFEBAD"|Drawn
|
|
|
|-
|198
|4 July 1923
|The Oval
|style="background:#FFCBCB"|Players
|six wickets
|
|
|-
|199
|18 July 1923
|Lord's
|style="background:#FFEBAD"|Drawn
|
|
|
|-
|200
|6 September 1923
|Scarborough
|style="background:#FFEBAD"|Drawn
|
|
|
|-
|201
|2 July 1924
|The Oval
|style="background:#FFCBCB"|Players
|six wickets
|
|
|-
|202
|16 July 1924
|Lord's
|style="background:#FFCBCB"|Players
|innings and 231 runs
|
|
|-
|203
|1 September 1924
|Blackpool
|style="background:#FFCBCB"|Players
|nine wickets
|The only Gentlemen v Players match at this venue.
|
|-
|204
|6 September 1924
|Scarborough
|style="background:#FFEBAD"|Drawn
|
|
|
|-
|205
|8 July 1925
|The Oval
|style="background:#B3B7FF"|Gentlemen
|four wickets
| Gentlemen broke a winless streak of 19 matches (10 losses, 9 drawn). 
|
|-
|206
|15 July 1925
|Lord's
|style="background:#FFEBAD"|Drawn
|
|
|
|-
|207
|2 September 1925
|Scarborough
|style="background:#FFEBAD"|Drawn
|
|
|
|-
|208
|5 September 1925
|Folkestone
|style="background:#FFCBCB"|Players
|nine wickets
|
|
|-
|209
|7 July 1926
|The Oval
|style="background:#FFCBCB"|Players
|seven wickets
|
|
|-
|210
|14 July 1926
|Lord's
|style="background:#FFEBAD"|Drawn
|
|
|
|-
|211
|1 September 1926
|Scarborough
|style="background:#FFEBAD"|Drawn
|
|Players captain Jack Hobbs scored 266, a record in Gentlemen v Players matches.
|
|-
|212
|6 July 1927
|The Oval
|style="background:#FFEBAD"|Drawn
|
|
|
|-
|213
|13 July 1927
|Lord's
|style="background:#FFEBAD"|Drawn
|
|
|
|-
|214
|31 August 1927
|Folkestone
|style="background:#FFCBCB"|Players
|innings and 81 runs
|
|
|-
|215
|3 September 1927
|Scarborough
|style="background:#FFEBAD"|Drawn
|
|
|
|-
|216
|6 June 1928 
|The Oval
|style="background:#FFEBAD"|Drawn
|
|
|
|-
|217
|18 July 1928
|Lord's
|style="background:#FFCBCB"|Players
|nine wickets
|
|
|-
|218
|5 September 1928
|Bournemouth
|style="background:#B3B7FF"|Gentlemen
|one wicket
|The only Gentlemen v Players match at this venue.
|
|-
|219
|8 September 1928
|Folkestone
|style="background:#FFCBCB"|Players
|five wickets
|
|
|-
|220
|10 July 1929
|The Oval
|style="background:#FFEBAD"|Drawn
|
|
|
|-
|221
|17 July 1929
|Lord's
|style="background:#FFCBCB"|Players
|seven wickets
|
|
|-
|222
|16 July 1930
|Lord's
|style="background:#FFEBAD"|Drawn
|
|
|
|-
|223
|10 September 1930
|Folkestone
|style="background:#FFEBAD"|Drawn
|
|
|
|-
|224
|10 June 1931 
|The Oval
|style="background:#FFEBAD"|Drawn
|
|
|
|-
|225
|15 July 1931
|Lord's
|style="background:#FFEBAD"|Drawn
|
|
|
|-
|226
|2 September 1931
|Folkestone
|style="background:#FFEBAD"|Drawn
|
|
|
|-
|227
|5 September 1931
|Scarborough
|style="background:#FFEBAD"|Drawn
|
|
|
|-
|228
|6 July 1932
|The Oval
|style="background:#FFEBAD"|Drawn
|
|
|
|-
|229
|13 July 1932
|Lord's
|style="background:#FFEBAD"|Drawn
|
|
|
|-
|230
|31 August 1932
|Folkestone
|style="background:#FFCBCB"|Players
|47 runs
|
|
|-
|231
|19 July 1933
|Lord's
|style="background:#FFCBCB"|Players
|ten wickets
|
|
|-
|232
|6 September 1933
|Folkestone
|style="background:#FFCBCB"|Players
|innings and 46 runs
|
|
|-
|233
|11 July 1934
|The Oval
|style="background:#FFCBCB"|Players
|innings and 305 runs
|
|
|-
|234
|25 July 1934
|Lord's
|style="background:#B3B7FF"|Gentlemen
|seven wickets
| Gentlemen broke a winless streak of 15 matches (six losses, nine drawn).
|
|-
|235
|5 September 1934
|Scarborough
|style="background:#FFEBAD"|Drawn
|
|Played simultaneously with the match below; Gentlemen, set 224 to win, were 203/9 when time expired.
|
|-
|236
|5 September 1934
|Folkestone
|style="background:#B3B7FF"|Gentlemen
|three wickets
|Played simultaneously with the match above.
|
|-
|237
|17 July 1935
|Lord's
|style="background:#FFCBCB"|Players
|nine wickets
|
|
|-
|238
|4 September 1935
|Folkestone
|style="background:#FFEBAD"|Drawn
|
|
|
|-
|239
|15 July 1936
|Lord's
|style="background:#FFEBAD"|Drawn
|
|
|
|-
|240
|5 September 1936
|Folkestone
|style="background:#FFEBAD"|Drawn
|
|
|
|-
|241
|14 July 1937
|Lord's
|style="background:#FFCBCB"|Players
|eight wickets
|
|
|-
|242
|13 July 1938
|Lord's
|style="background:#B3B7FF"|Gentlemen
|133 runs
|
|
|-
|243
|7 September 1938
|Scarborough
|style="background:#FFCBCB"|Players
|five wickets
| Players scored 5/130 in 50 minutes to win with one minute remaining.
|
|-
|244
|5 July 1939
|Lord's
|style="background:#FFCBCB"|Players
|160 runs
|
|
|-
|245
|17 July 1946
|Lord's
|style="background:#FFCBCB"|Players
|innings and 140 runs
|Gentlemen collapsed from 138/4 to 144 all out in first innings.
|
|-
|246
|16 July 1947
|Lord's
|style="background:#FFEBAD"|Drawn
|
|
|
|-
|247
|10 September 1947
|Scarborough
|style="background:#FFCBCB"|Players
|innings and ten runs
|
|
|-
|248
|14 July 1948
|Lord's
|style="background:#FFEBAD"|Drawn
|
|
|
|-
|249
|13 July 1949
|Lord's
|style="background:#FFCBCB"|Players
|four wickets
|
|
|-
|250
|26 July 1950
|Lord's
|style="background:#FFEBAD"|Drawn
|
|Players, set 253 to win, were 241/9 when time expired.
|
|-
|251
|18 July 1951
|Lord's
|style="background:#FFCBCB"|Players
|21 runs
|
|
|-
|252
|5 September 1951
|Scarborough
|style="background:#FFEBAD"|Drawn
|
|
|
|-
|253
|23 July 1952
|Lord's
|style="background:#FFCBCB"|Players
|two runs
|
|
|-
|254
|6 September 1952
|Scarborough
|style="background:#FFEBAD"|Drawn
|
|Gentlemen, set 254 to win, were 252/8 when time expired.
|
|-
|255
|15 July 1953
|Lord's
|style="background:#B3B7FF"|Gentlemen
|95 runs
|
|
|-
|256
|5 September 1953
|Scarborough
|style="background:#B3B7FF"|Gentlemen
|five wickets
|Gentlemen won after conceding 532/5 declared (Len Hutton 241) in first innings.
|
|-
|257
|14 July 1954
|Lord's
|style="background:#FFCBCB"|Players
|49 runs
|
|
|-
|258
|4 September 1954
|Scarborough
|style="background:#FFCBCB"|Players
|50 runs
|
|
|-
|259
|13 July 1955
|Lord's
|style="background:#FFCBCB"|Players
|20 runs
|
|
|-
|260
|3 September 1955
|Scarborough
|style="background:#FFCBCB"|Players
|two wickets
|
|
|-
|261
|18 July 1956
|Lord's
|style="background:#FFEBAD"|Drawn
|
|
|
|-
|262
|1 September 1956
|Scarborough
|style="background:#FFCBCB"|Players
|seven wickets
|
|
|-
|263
|17 July 1957
|Lord's
|style="background:#FFEBAD"|Drawn
|
|Players (46/9 declared in the first innings), set 290 to win, were 242/9 when time expired.
|
|-
|264
|4 September 1957
|Scarborough
|style="background:#FFCBCB"|Players
|six wickets
|
|
|-
|265
|16 July 1958
|Lord's
|style="background:#FFEBAD"|Drawn
|
|
|
|-
|266
|6 September 1958
|Scarborough
|style="background:#FFCBCB"|Players
|55 runs
|
|
|-
|267
|15 July 1959
|Lord's
|style="background:#FFEBAD"|Drawn
|
|
|
|-
|268
|5 September 1959
|Scarborough
|style="background:#FFCBCB"|Players
|ten wickets
|
|
|-
|269
|13 July 1960
|Lord's
|style="background:#FFEBAD"|Drawn
|
|
|
|-
|270
|3 September 1960
|Scarborough
|style="background:#FFEBAD"|Drawn
|
|
|
|-
|271
|19 July 1961
|Lord's
|style="background:#FFCBCB"|Players
|172 runs
|
|
|-
|272
|2 September 1961
|Scarborough
|style="background:#FFCBCB"|Players
|54 runs
|
|
|-
|273
|18 July 1962
|Lord's
|style="background:#FFEBAD"|Drawn
|
|
|
|-
|274
|8 September 1962
|Scarborough
|style="background:#FFCBCB"|Players
|seven wickets
|
|
|}

References

Gentlemen v Players
English cricket lists